Prince of Wales Dock may refer to:
Prince of Wales Dock, Edinburgh
Prince of Wales Dock, Swansea, part of Swansea Docks
Prince of Wales Dock, Workington, Cumbria

See also
 Princes Dock (disambiguation)